William Carragan, American musicologist, is particularly known for his research into the music of Anton Bruckner. His primary concerns are analytical aspects of the music, and history of Bruckner performance. He is a contributing editor of the Bruckner Collected Edition in Vienna, sponsored by the International Bruckner Society.

Career 
He was Professor of Physics at Hudson Valley Community College in Troy, New York, U.S.A., from 1965 to 2001, and is the author of a comprehensive four-volume textbook of introductory university physics.

Bruckner Editions 
For the Collected Edition, at the request of Leopold Nowak, Carragan prepared a new edition of Bruckner's Second Symphony in two versions (1872 and 1877).Carragan reconstructed for the first time the first version of Bruckner's First (1866), the previously unheard versions of the Third from 1874 and 1876, and of the Fourth from 1878, as well as the 1888 intermediate versions of the Eighth.He has also devoted himself to completing Bruckner's Ninth symphony. That completion has been widely performed and recorded, the most recently in a revised version from 2017. Carragan has served as consultant in many performances of Bruckner symphonies.In 1991 he was accorded the Gold-Plakette of the Brucknerbund Oberösterreich, and in 2010 he was awarded the Kilenyi Medal of Honor of the Bruckner Society of America.

William Carragan is the author of the book Anton Bruckner: Eleven Symphonies – a "Red Book" on the different versions of Bruckner's Symphonies issued by the Bruckner Society of America.

Schubert Editions 
For the Franz Schubert anniversary of 1978, Carragan completed and performed several of Schubert's unfinished piano sonatas, and ten years later he prepared a four-movement version of the Schubert's Eighth symphony which has been recently recorded in Germany  and Japan.

Other Works
With respect to the baroque era, Carragan made arrangements of a concerto for four violins by Antonio Vivaldi, Op. 3, no. 1, for four harpsichord, as well as a concerto for two violins, Op. 3, no. 8, arranged after J.S. Bach for two harpsichords.

References

External links 
  

1937 births
Living people
American musicologists
People from Troy, New York